Rhodes is the Greek Dodecanese island where the Colossus of Rhodes stood.

Rhodes may also refer to:

Places and jurisdictions

Europe
 Rhodes (regional unit), Greece
 Rhodes (city), the main settlement on the island of Rhodes, Dodecanese, Greece
 Rhodes, Moselle, a commune of the Moselle department, France
 Rhodes, Greater Manchester, a village in England
 Appenzell Ausserrhoden, a canton in Switzerland also known as Appenzell Outer Rhodes
 Appenzell Innerrhoden, a canton in Switzerland also known as Appenzell Inner Rhodes

United States
 Rhode Island, a state
 Rhodes, Indiana, an unincorporated community
 Rhodes, Iowa, a city
 Rhodes Hill, a summit of Savage Mountain, Maryland
 Rhodes, Michigan, an unincorporated community
 Rhodes, Montana, a census-designated place

Elsewhere
 Rhodes, South Africa, a small tourist town in Eastern Cape
 Rhodes, New South Wales, Australia

People 
 Rhodes (surname)
 Rhodes (singer), stagename of David Rhodes, a British musician, singer and songwriter
 Cecil John Rhodes 19th century South African politician
Cecil Rhodes (disambiguation) Disambiguation of "Cecil Rhodes".
 Jonty Rhodes, South African cricketer

Arts, entertainment, and media
 Mr. Rhodes, an American television sitcom
 Rhodes (TV series), a 1996 British television series about the life of Cecil Rhodes
 Rhodes Singers, concert choir of Rhodes College in Memphis, Tennessee
Rhodes of Africa, a 1936 film about the life of Cecil John Rhodes.
Rhodes, a fictional town in the video game Red Dead Redemption 2

Brands and enterprises
 Rhodes Brothers, a department store in Tacoma, WA
 Rhodes Furniture, defunct American furniture retailer
 Rhodes piano, an electric piano invented by Harold Rhodes

Education 
 Rhodes College, a college in Memphis, Tennessee
 Rhodes Preparatory School, formerly in Manhattan, New York City
 Rhodes Scholarship, an international postgraduate award for students to study at the University of Oxford
 Rhodes State College, a college in Lima, Ohio named after James A. Rhodes
 Rhodes University, a college in Grahamstown, South Africa

Grapes
 Rhodes (grape), a synonym for the Athiri grape used to make Retsina on the Island of Rhodes
 Rhoditis, a pink-skinned Greek wine grape often blended into Retsina

Other 
 Metropolis of Rhode, the Greek Orthodox metropolitan see covering the island of Rhodes
 Rhodes Framework, a framework for developing smartphone applications
 Rhodes Trail Run, a 52 km trail run that takes place in the southern Drakensberg of South Africa
 Rhodes grass (Chloris gayana), a species of grass native to Africa but found throughout the tropical and subtropical world
 USS Rhodes (DE-384) (1943–1963), a U.S. Navy destroyer escort

See also 
 Rhodesia (disambiguation)
 Justice Rhodes (disambiguation)
 Rhoades, a surname
 Rodès, a commune in Pyrénées-Orientales department, France
 Rhoads, a surname
 Rodos (disambiguation)